Metalobosia postflavida is a moth of the subfamily Arctiinae. It was described by Max Wilhelm Karl Draudt in 1918. It is found in Panama.

References

 

Lithosiini
Moths described in 1918